Lankum are a contemporary Irish folk music group from Dublin, consisting of brothers Ian and Daragh Lynch, Cormac MacDiarmada and Radie Peat. In 2018 they were named Best Folk Group at the RTÉ Folk Music Awards, while Radie Peat was named Best Folk Singer. The band were nominated for the RTÉ Choice Music Prize Irish Album of the Year in 2017 for their album Between the Earth and Sky, and won the prize in 2019 for their album The Livelong Day.

History 
The group were originally known as Lynched, after the brothers' surname, and released their debut album Cold Old Fire (2014) under that name. In October 2016 they announced in a statement that they were changing their name to Lankum to avoid associations with the practice of lynching. The statement read: "We will not continue to work under our current name while the systemic persecution and murder of black people in the USA continues." The name Lankum comes from the folk ballad "False Lankum", as sung by the Irish traveller and folk singer John Reilly.

In 2017, the band signed to Rough Trade Records and recorded their album Between The Earth and Sky, to analogue tape with producer/ engineer Julie McLarnon, before recording the final track "the Granite Gaze", and mixing the album with producer John "Spud" Murphy in Guerrilla Studios, Dublin.  It was released on 27 October 2017 and subsequently nominated for BBC Radio 2 Folk Awards. Mojo named it folk 'album of the year' 2017.

In 2019, the band recorded "The Livelong Day" with producer/engineer John "Spud" Murphy in the Meadows recording studio, Wicklow and in Guerrilla Studios, Dublin. It was released on 25 October 2019 and went on to win the RTÉ Choice Prize 2019.

In 2019, Lankum's video for The Young People, directed by filmmaker Bob Gallagher, won Best Irish Music Video Award at the Irish Film Festival in London, England.

Artistry 
Their music has been characterised as "a younger, darker Pogues with more astonishing power".  Reviewing their third album The Livelong Day (2019) for The Guardian, Jude Rogers described it as "a folk album influenced by the ambient textures of Sunn O))) and Swans, plus the sonic intensity of Xylouris White and My Bloody Valentine".

Members
Ian Lynch – vocals, uilleann pipes, concertina, tin whistle, percussion
Daragh Lynch – vocals, guitar, percussion, piano
Cormac Mac Diarmada – vocals, fiddle, viola, banjo, double bass, vibraphone, piano, percussion
Radie Peat – vocals, bayan, concertina, harmonium, organ, piano, electric organ, harp, mellotron

Discography
Where Did We Go Wrong?! (2003)  - as Lynched (only Ian and Daragh Lynch) 
Cold Old Fire (2014) – as Lynched

Awards and nominations

RTÉ Choice Music Prize

|-
|align="center" | 2017 || Between The Earth And Sky || Album of the Year || 
|-
|-
|align="center" | 2019 || The Livelong Day || Album of the Year || 
|-

RTÉ Radio 1 Folk Awards

|-
|align="center" | 2018 || Lankum || Best Folk Group || 
|-
|align="center" | 2018 || Radie Peat || Best Folk Singer || 
|-
|align="center" | 2020 || Lankum || Best Folk Group || 
|-
|align="center" | 2020 || Radie Peat || Best Folk Singer || 
|-

BBC Radio 2 Folk Awards

|-
|align="center" | 2016 || Lynched || Best Group || 
|-
|align="center" | 2016 || Cold Old Fire || Best Album || 
|-
|align="center" | 2016 || Lynched || Horizon Award || 
|-
|align="center" | 2018 || Lankum || Best Group || 
|-
|align="center" | 2018 || The Granite Gaze || Best Original Song || 
|-

Other notable accolades

|-
|align="center" | 2019 || The Livelong Day || NPR Music's 25 Best Albums of 2019 || 8th
|-
|align="center" | 2019 || The Livelong Day || MOJO's 75 Best Albums of 2019 || 58th
|-
|-
|align="center" | 2020 || Lankum || The Irish Times 50 Best Irish Acts In Order || 8th
|-

Notes 
 Ian and Darragh Lynch released Where Did We Do Wrong?! in 2003 as Lynched. However, it seems that this incarnation of Lynched is not the same musical project as that of the same name which would go on to become Lankum, as Cold Old Fire, released in 2014 with Cormac Mac Diarmada and Radie Peat, is often described as the group's "debut album".

References

External links
Official website
Lynched website (no longer updated)

Musical groups from Dublin (city)
Irish folk musical groups